George Bell may refer to:

Law and politics
 George Joseph Bell (1770–1843), Scottish jurist and legal author
 George Alexander Bell (1856–1927), Canadian pioneer and Saskatchewan politician
 George Bell (Canadian politician) (1869–1940), politician in British Columbia
 George John Bell (1872–1944), Australian politician
 George Bell (trade unionist) (1878–1959), British trade union leader
 George E. Bell (1883–1970), Canadian politician
 George T. Bell (1913–1973), special assistant to United States President Richard Nixon
 George W. Bell, doctor and state legislator in Arkansas

Military
 George Bell (British Army officer) (1794–1877), Irish general
 George Bell (brigadier general) (1828–1907), American Civil War brigadier general
 George H. Bell (1839–1917), American Civil War sailor and Medal of Honor recipient
 George Bell Jr. (1859–1926), United States Army major general
 George Gray Bell (1920–2000), Canadian soldier, civil servant, and academic

Sports
 George Bell (pitcher) (1874–1941), American baseball player
 George Bell (footballer, born 1861) (1861–1959), English footballer
 George Bell (Australian footballer) (1912–1999), Australian rules footballer
 George Bell (basketball) (born 1957), Harlem Globetrotter and tallest American man
 George Bell (outfielder) (born 1959), Dominican Republic baseball player
 George Bell (rugby union) (born 2002), New Zealand rugby union player

Others
 George Bell (surgeon) (1777–1832) official Surgeon to King George IV in Scotland, son of Benjamin Bell
 George Bell (editor) (1809–1899), New Zealand newspaper proprietor and editor
 George Bell (publisher) (1814–1890), British publisher, founder of George Bell & Sons
 George Bell (painter) (1878–1966), Australian painter 
 George Bell (bishop) (1883–1958), Anglican bishop of Chichester
 Max Bell (George Maxwell Bell, 1912–1972), Canadian newspaper publisher and businessman
 George Irving Bell (1926–2000), American physicist, biologist and mountaineer
 George Bell (activist) (1761–1843), Advocate and activist for African American education
 "George Bell", pseudonym of George Roussos (1915–2000), American comic book artist

See also
 George Bell & Sons, defunct London publishing house, operating 1836–1986
 George Ball (disambiguation)
 George Bull (disambiguation)